Mary Hansen was a singer.

Mary Hansen or Hanson may also refer to:

Mary Hansen (politician)
Mary Hanson (born 1944), TV presenter
Harold and Mary Jean Hanson Rare Book Collection